Good Vibes may refer to:

 Good Vibes (Philippine TV series), a Philippine musical drama series
 Good Vibes (U.S. TV series), an American animated television series on MTV
 Good Vibes (Gary Burton album), 1969
 Good Vibes (The Natural Four album), 1970
 Good Vibes (Johnny Lytle album)
 "Good Vibes" (Nadav Guedj song)
 "Good Vibes" (Chris Janson song)

See also
 Good Vibrations (disambiguation)